New Bedford is an unincorporated community located within Wall Township in Monmouth County, New Jersey, United States.

Notable people
People who were born in, residents of, or otherwise closely associated with New Bedford include:
 George B. Cooper (1808-1866), politician who was elected to the United States House of Representatives in 1858, but left office after a year when Congress awarded the seat to his opponent in 1860.

References

Wall Township, New Jersey
Unincorporated communities in Monmouth County, New Jersey
Unincorporated communities in New Jersey